Able is a surname.  Notable people with the surname include:

 Forest Able (born 1932), American basketball player
 George Graham Able (born 1947), British educationalist
 Whitney Able (born 1982), American actress and model

See also
Abel (surname)